The Institute for Cosmic Ray Research (ICRR) of the University of Tokyo (東京大学宇宙線研究所 Tōkyōdaigaku Uchūsen Kenkyūsho) was established in 1976 for the study of cosmic rays.

The gravitational wave studies group is currently constructing the detector KAGRA located at the Kamioka Observatory.

Facilities
 Kashiwa Campus at the University of Tokyo
 Akeno Observatory
 Kamioka Observatory 
 Norikura Observatory

Current projects
Super-Kamiokande - Detection of neutrinos and search for proton decays in a large water tank
Tibet - Search for point sources of VHE cosmic gamma rays at Tibet heights
Telescope Array Project - Aiming at highest energy cosmic ray physics by detecting weak light from atmosphere
Gravitational Wave Group - Constructing the gravitational wave detector KAGRA
Observational Cosmology Group - Subaru Hyper Suprime-Cam Survey
Theory Group - Theoretical studies for verifying Grand Unified Theory and early Universe
High Energy Astrophysics Group - Theoretical studies for pulsars, gamma-ray bursts, AGNs, acceleration mechanisms of particles etc.

References

External links
 

Astrophysics institutes
Research institutes in Japan
University of Tokyo